Leo Stein, born Leo Rosenstein (25 March 1861, Lemberg – 28 July 1921, Vienna, Austria) was a playwright and librettist of operettas in the latter part of the 19th and early 20th centuries, including works adapted for a number of Broadway productions.

Stein wrote libretti for Johann Strauss Jr, Franz Lehár, Emmerich Kálmán, and Oskar Nedbal. His collaboration with  Viktor Léon contributed much to Lehár's success.

A selection of his works includes Wiener Blut (1899), Die lustige Witwe (1905), Der Graf von Luxemburg (1909) and Die Csárdásfürstin (1915).

Stein is buried at the Vienna Zentralfriedhof.

Filmography
The Merry Widow, directed by Michael Curtiz (Hungary, 1918)
, directed by Emil Leyde (Austria, 1919)
The Merry Widow, directed by Erich von Stroheim (1925)
The Count of Luxembourg, directed by Arthur Gregor (1926)
The Sweet Girl, directed by Manfred Noa (Germany, 1926)
Schützenliesel, directed by Rudolf Walther-Fein and Rudolf Dworsky (Germany, 1926)
The Csardas Princess, directed by Hanns Schwarz (Germany, 1927)
The Csardas Princess, directed by Georg Jacoby (Germany, 1934)
Polish Blood, directed by Karel Lamač (Germany, 1934)
The Merry Widow, directed by Ernst Lubitsch (1934)
Kungen kommer, directed by Ragnar Hyltén-Cavallius (Sweden, 1936, based on Der Gauklerkönig)
Vienna Blood, directed by Willi Forst (Germany, 1942)
Silva, directed by Aleksandr Ivanovsky (Soviet Union, 1944, based on The Csardas Princess)
The Csardas Princess, directed by Georg Jacoby (West Germany, 1951)
The Merry Widow, directed by Curtis Bernhardt (1952)
Schützenliesel, directed by Rudolf Schündler (West Germany, 1954)
The Count of Luxembourg, directed by Werner Jacobs (West Germany, 1957)
The Merry Widow, directed by Werner Jacobs (Austria, 1962)
, directed by Miklós Szinetár (West Germany, 1971)
The Count of Luxembourg, directed by Wolfgang Glück (West Germany, 1972)
, directed by Yan Frid (Soviet Union, 1981, based on The Csardas Princess)

References

External links

Austrian operetta librettists
Austrian male writers
19th-century Austrian people
Writers from Lviv
Austrian Jews
1861 births
1921 deaths
Burials at the Vienna Central Cemetery